Phase II of 113 East Roosevelt is a skyscraper planned for Chicago, Illinois in the Near South Side community area. It will be located at the southeast corner of Roosevelt Road and Michigan Avenue, located adjacent to the southwest corner of Grant Park.  The skyscraper is designed by Rafael Viñoly as the second of a three phase development that includes a slightly shorter Phase I NEMA (Chicago) and a 100-unit townhouse development and public park as the third phase. It is planned to have 648 units that will likely be condominiums.  Miami developer Crescent Heights acquired the real estate for the development in 2012 for $29.5 million. The development was presented in a community meeting on September 22, 2015. The Chicago Plan Commission approved the development on November 19, 2015, in a meeting that also resulted in the approval of the Wanda Vista tower. The building will be located on a  site. Financing is a prerequisite to initial groundbreaking.

See also
List of tallest buildings in Chicago
List of tallest buildings in the United States

References

Proposed buildings and structures in Illinois
Proposed skyscrapers in the United States
Residential skyscrapers in Chicago
Residential condominiums in Chicago